Ostrica (Serbian Cyrillic: Острица) is a mountain in central Serbia, near the town of Gornji Milanovac. Its highest peak has an elevation of 802 meters above sea level.

References

Mountains of Serbia